Odostomia didyma is a species of sea snail, a marine gastropod mollusc in the family Pyramidellidae, the pyrams and their allies.

Description
The size of the shell of this micromollusc varies between 1.2 mm and 2.7 mm.

Distribution
This species occurs in the Gulf of Mexico (Florida Keys to Texas),the Caribbean Sea (Colombia) and the Atlantic Ocean (the Bermudas).

References

External links
 
 To World Register of Marine Species

didyma
Gastropods described in 1900